Xanthopteromyia is a genus of flies in the family Tachinidae.

Species
Xanthopteromyia plumosa (Townsend, 1928)
Xanthopteromyia tegulata Townsend, 1926

References

Diptera of Asia
Dexiinae
Tachinidae genera
Taxa named by Charles Henry Tyler Townsend